National figure skating championships of the 2017–2018 season took place mainly between December 2017 and January 2018. They were held to crown national champions and some competitions served as part of the selection process for international events such as the 2018 Winter Olympics and ISU Figure Skating Championships. Medals may be awarded in the disciplines of men's singles, ladies' singles, pair skating, and ice dancing. A few countries chose to organize their national championships together with their neighbors; the results were subsequently divided into national podiums.

Competitions 
Key

Senior medalists

Men

Ladies

Pairs

Ice dancing

Junior medalists

Men

Ladies

Pairs

Ice dancing

References

Nationals
Nationals
Figure skating national championships